The first season of the American television science fiction comedy series The Neighbors premiered on September 26, 2012 and concluded on March 27, 2013 on ABC. The series was created by Dan Fogelman and produced by Fogelman, Chris Koch, Aaron Kaplan, John Hoberg, Kat Likkel, Kristin Newman, Kirker Butler, and Jeffrey Morton. The series follows the Weavers (Jami Gertz, Lenny Venito, Max Charles, Isabella Cramp, and Clara Mamet), a family of humans who relocate to a gated community, which happens to be inhabited by aliens, such as the Bird-Kersees (Simon Templeman, Toks Olagundoye, Ian Patrick, and Tim Jo).

Cast

Main cast
 Jami Gertz as Debbie Weaver (22 episodes)
 Lenny Venito as Marty Weaver (22 episodes)
 Simon Templeman as Larry Bird (22 episodes)
 Toks Olagundoye as Jackie Joyner-Kersee (22 episodes)
 Max Charles as Max Weaver (21 episodes)
 Isabella Cramp as Abby Weaver (19 episodes)
 Clara Mamet as Amber Weaver (19 episodes)
 Ian Patrick as Dick Butkus (20 episodes)
 Tim Jo as Reggie Jackson (21 episodes)

Recurring cast
 Patrick O'Sullivan as Johnny Unitas (7 episodes)
 Katherine Tokarz as Mary Lou Retton (7 episodes)
 Grant Harvey as Jeremy (6 episodes)
 Doug Jones as Dominique Wilkins (6 episodes)
 Alden Villaverde as Kareem Abdul-Jabbar (5 episodes)
 Robert T. Barrett as Jeff Gordon (5 episodes)
 Lora Plattner as Giselle Braxton (4 episodes)
 Kiersten Lyons as Billie Jean King (4 episodes)
 Stacy Keach as Dominick Weaver (2 episodes)

Guest stars
 Amy Farrington as Tracy ("Things Just Got Real")
 Meagen Fay as Principal ("Bathroom Etiquette")
 Maribeth Monroe as Rebecca Hill ("Larry Bird and the Iron Throne")
 Leslie Jordan as Carla ("Thanksgiving Is for the Bird-Kersees")
 Debra Mooney as Theresa Weaver ("Thanksgiving Is for the Bird-Kersees")
 Nora Dunn as Linda ("The Gingerbread Man")
 Michael Bay as himself ("Mother Clubbers")
 Sandra Bernhard as Ms. Porsche ("I Believe I Can Drive")
 Bethenny Frankel as Jill ("Mo Purses Mo Money Mo Problems")
 George Takei as Grandfather ("It Has Begun...")
 Mark Hamill as Commander Bill ("It Has Begun...")

Episodes

 Jami Gertz, Lenny Venito, Simon Templeman, and Toks Olagundoye appear in all episodes
 Max Charles and Tim Jo were absent for 1 episode.
 Ian Patrick was absent from two episodes.
 Isabella Cramp and Clara Mamet were absent from three episodes.

U.S. ratings

References

External links
 
 

The Neighbors (2012 TV series)
2012 American television seasons
2013 American television seasons